Jürgen Pinter (born 30 March 1979 in Villach) is an Austrian cross-country skier. He competed in cross-country skiing at the 2006 Winter Olympics in Turin. He participated at the FIS Nordic World Ski Championships 2011. In November 2008 he was handed a four-year ban from sports for doping.

Doping scandal in Turin 
Pinter was banned by the International Olympic Committee (IOC) for life from the Olympic Games for his involvement in a doping scandal at the 2006 Winter Olympics in Turin. The International Ski Federation (FIS) cleared him in their anti-doping hearing of the case while three other Austrian cross-country skiers were handed doping bans. The World Anti-Doping Agency (WADA) appealed Pinters case to the Court of Arbitration for Sport (CAS), and in November 2008 he was handed a four-year ban from sports.

Olympic results

World Championship results

World Cup results
All results are sourced from the International Ski Federation (FIS).

World Cup standings

References

External links

1979 births
Living people
Doping cases in cross-country skiing
Austrian sportspeople in doping cases
Sportspeople from Villach
Austrian male cross-country skiers
Olympic cross-country skiers of Austria
Cross-country skiers at the 2006 Winter Olympics